KCJK (105.1 FM, branded as "105.1 The X") is radio station licensed to Garden City, Missouri. Owned by Cumulus Media, it broadcasts an active rock format serving the Kansas City area. The station's studios are located in Overland Park, Kansas, while its transmitter is located in Independence, Missouri.

History

e105
105.1 was originally the frequency for KKJO-FM in St. Joseph, which is now at the frequency of 105.5. KFME ("e105"), with its 1980s hits/Hot AC-hybrid format, debuted at 2 p.m. on June 18, 2001, with "You Get What You Give" by the New Radicals being the first song played. The station was initially owned by Jesscom and Susquehanna Broadcasting as part of a joint ownership venture. The station was re-licensed to Garden City, Missouri (south of Kansas City). The station had modest results and earned an NAB Crystal Award for Public Service.

Jack FM 
After Susquehanna assumed full ownership, KFME flipped to adult hits, and rebranded as "105.1 Jack FM", on October 7, 2004, at Noon. e105's final song was "Don't Speak" by No Doubt, while Jack FM's first song was "Dancing Queen" by ABBA. KFME would later change call letters to KCJK. Jack FM initially debuted with considerable success. Like other Jack stations, KCJK was mostly jockless and stuck to a computerized playlist, highlighted by segments that include the “No-Request Nooner” and liners chastising drivers who slow down to see accidents in the opposite set of freeway lanes.

KCJK and Susquehanna's properties were acquired by Cumulus Media in May 2006. Upon taking over the station, Cumulus added live disc jockeys, a rare move for an adult hits outlet. Most of the station's air talent were let go in 2013, and KCJK returned to being automated and jockless.

Alternative rock

On June 15, 2016, at 7:30 a.m., after playing a block of "end"-themed songs (including "Enjoy the Silence" by Depeche Mode, "In the End" by Linkin Park, "Should I Stay or Should I Go" by The Clash, "Come Sail Away" by Styx, and "Closing Time" by Semisonic, which then culminated with "The Final Countdown" by Europe), KCJK swapped formats with K273BZ/KCMO-FM-HD2, adopted their alternative rock format, and rebranded as "X 105.1." The first song on "X" was "Uprising" by Muse. KCJK competed with Entercom's KRBZ, who was ranked 6th with a 4.6 in the April 2016 Nielsen ratings report for the Kansas City market (KCJK was ranked 13th with a 3.6 share). The format swap marked the third time a station in the Kansas City market used the "X" moniker, the first being KXXR from June 1990 to June 1991, and KCCX/KNRX from March 1997 to January 1999. Much of the programming originated from other markets, including The Woody Show in morning drive from Los Angeles. The midday and evening shifts were voice-tracked by DJs at WKQX in Chicago.

On February 7, 2019, Afentra, formerly of KRBZ, joined KCJK for afternoons. Eight months later, Afentra left the station.

Active rock
On October 10, 2019, at Midnight, after playing "Helena" by My Chemical Romance, KCJK relaunched as 105.1 The X, shifting toward a hybrid format with an active rock-leaning presentation that continues to feature an emphasis on alternative rock content alongside other hard rock hits (dubbed "rockternative", with examples spanning from Disturbed, AC/DC and Mötley Crüe, to Pearl Jam, Tool and Panic! at the Disco). The first song after the relaunch was "Plush" by Stone Temple Pilots. The station continues to air the syndicated Woody Show in morning drive, while other dayparts are held by local DJs.

References

External links

CJK
Cass County, Missouri
Radio stations established in 2004
Cumulus Media radio stations
2004 establishments in Kansas
Active rock radio stations in the United States